The 2002 Dubai Tennis Championships and Dubai Duty Free Women's Open were tennis tournaments played on outdoor hard courts at the Aviation Club Tennis Centre in Dubai in the United Arab Emirates that were part of the International Series Gold of the 2002 ATP Tour and of Tier II of the 2002 WTA Tour. The men's tournament was held from February 25 through March 3, 2002 while the women's tournament was held from February 18 through February 23, 2002. Fabrice Santoro and Amélie Mauresmo won the singles titles.

Finals

Men's singles

 Fabrice Santoro defeated  Younes El Aynaoui 6–4, 3–6, 6–3
 It was Santoro's 1st title of the year and the 12th of his career.

Women's singles

 Amélie Mauresmo defeated  Sandrine Testud 6–4, 7–6(7–3)
 It was Mauresmo's 1st title of the year and the 8th of her career.

Men's doubles

 Mark Knowles /  Daniel Nestor defeated  Joshua Eagle /  Sandon Stolle 3–6, 6–3, [13–11]
 It was Knowles' 2nd title of the year and the 19th of his career. It was Nestor's 2nd title of the year and the 22nd of his career.

Women's doubles

 Barbara Rittner /  María Vento-Kabchi defeated  Sandrine Testud /  Roberta Vinci 6–3, 6–2
 It was Rittner's only title of the year and the 5th of her career. It was Vento-Kabchi's 1st title of the year and the 1st of her career.

External links
 Official website
 ATP Tournament Profile
 WTA Tournament Profile

 
2002
Dubai Tennis Championships
Dubai Duty Free Women's Open